The 1921 All-Big Ten Conference football team consists of American football players selected to the All-Big Ten Conference teams chosen by various selectors for the 1921 Big Ten Conference football season.

All Big-Ten selections

Ends
 Fritz Crisler, Chicago (BE-1; CA-1; WE-1; LH-1)
 Stevens Gould, Wisconsin (CA-1; WE-1; LH-1; BE-2 [halfback])
 Truck Myers, Ohio State (WE-1; LH-1)
 Lester Belding, Iowa (BE-1; WE-2)
 Gus Tebell, Wisconsin (BE-2; WE-3)
 Paul G. Goebel, Michigan (BE-2; WE-3)

Tackles
 Charles McGuire, Chicago (BE-1; CA-1; WE-1; LH-1)
 Duke Slater, Iowa (BE-1; CA-1; WE-1; LH-1)
 James Brader, Wisconsin (BE-2; WE-2)
 Iolas Huffman (BE-2; WE-2)
 Robert H. Spiers, Ohio State (WE-3)
 Ed Carman, Purdue (WE-3)

Guards
 Robert J. Dunne, Michigan (CA-1; WE-1; LH-1)
 Lloyd Pixley, Ohio State (BE-1; CA-1; LH-1)
 Dean W. Trott, Ohio State (BE-1; WE-1)
 Charles Redmon, Chicago (BE-2; WE-2)
 Albert W. T. Mohr, Jr., Illinois (WE-2)
 Ferdinand Birk, Purdue (BE-2)
 Paul Minick, Iowa (WE-3)
 William G. McCaw, Indiana (WE-3)

Centers
 Ernie Vick, Michigan (BE-2; CA-1; WE-1)
 George C. Bunge, Wisconsin (BE-1; WE-2; LH-1)
 Jack Heldt, Iowa (WE-3)

Quarterbacks
 Aubrey Devine, Iowa (BE-1; CA-1; WE-1; LH-1)
 Milton Romney, Chicago (CA-2; WE-2)
 Hoge Workman, Ohio State (BE-2)
 Irwin Uteritz, Michigan (WE-3)

Halfbacks
 Alvah Elliott, Wisconsin (BE-1; CA-1; WE-1; LH-1)
 Laurie Walquist, Illinois (CA-2; WE-2; LH-1)
 John D. Stuart, Ohio State (BE-2; CA-1; WE-3)
 Don Peden, Illinois (WE-1)
 Roland Williams, Wisconsin (BE-1)
 Franklin Cappon, Michigan (CA-2; WE-2)
 Earl Martineau, Minnesota (WE-3)

Fullbacks
 Gordon Locke, Iowa (BE-1; CA-1; WE-1; LH-1)
 Guy Sundt, Wisconsin (BE-2; CA-2; WE-3)
 John Webster Thomas, Chicago (WE-2)

Key

BE = Billy Evans, "N.E.A. Sports Expert; American League Umpire; and Football Official"

CA = Chicago American, selected by Harold Johnson

WE = Walter Eckersall for the Chicago Tribune

LH = Luther A. Huston of the International News Service

See also
1921 College Football All-America Team

References

1921 Big Ten Conference football season
All-Big Ten Conference football teams